A great number of words of French origin have entered the English language to the extent that many Latin words have come to the English language.

J

jabot
jacinth
jacket, Old Fr. , diminutive form of 
jade
j'adoube
jail
jalousie
jamb
jambalaya
James, Old Fr. 
Jane, Old Fr. 
jangle
janizary
January
jape
jar
jardinière
jargon
jasmine
jasper
jaundice
jaunt
jaunty
javelin
jaw
jay, Old Fr. , compare Mod. Fr. 
je ne sais quoi
jealous
jealousy
Jean
jeans
Jeffrey
jelly (from )
jennet
jeopardy
jeremiad
Jerome
jersey
jest
jet
jete
jetsam
jettison
jetty
Jew, Old Fr. 
jewel, Old Fr. , compare Mod. Fr. 
jeweller
jewelry
Jocelin
jocund
joie de vivre
join, from 
joinder
joiner
joint
jointure
joist
jollity
jolly
jongleur
jonquil
jouissance
journal
journalism
journalist
journey (Old Fr. )
joust
jovial
joviality
joy
joyous
jubilation
jubilee
judge, from 
judgement
judgment
judicious
juggle, from 
juggler
juice
julep
julienne
July
jupe
Jurassic
juridic
jurist
jury
just, from Old French 
justice, from Old French, compare modern Fr. 
justiciable
justifiable
justification
justify
juxtapose
juxtaposition

K

kamagraphy
kaolin, Fr. , from Chinese 
kennel
kepi, Fr. , from Swiss Germ. 
kerchief
kermess or kirmess (Fr. ')
kern
kestrel
khedive
kilo, Fr. , from Greek 
kilogram, Fr. 
kilometre or kilometer, Fr. 
kinematic
kiosk, Fr. , from Turkish , from Persian 
kir

L

label
laborious
labour or labor, Old Fr. , compare Mod. Fr. 
lace
lackey, Middle Fr. 
lacquer
lacrosse
lactose
lagoon, Fr. , from Italian , from Latin 
laic
laissez-faire
laissez-passer
laity
lake
Lambert
lamé
lamentable
lamp
lampoon
lamprey
lance
Lancelot
lancer
lancet
language (Old Fr. )
languish
languor
languorous
L'Anse aux Meadows (Fr.  : Jellyfish Cove)
lantern
lanyard
lapidary
lapse
larceny
lard
large
largess
larynx
las
lash
lassitude
lateen
latent
latitude
latrine
lattice
laud
launch
launder
laundry
laurel
Laurence or Lawrence
lavage
lavalier
lavender
laver (Fr. )
lavish
lawn
laxative
laxity
lay (adj. and n.)
layette
league
lease
leash
leaven
lecher
lecherous
lechery
lecithin
lectern
lees
legacy
legend
legerdemain
legion
legionnaire
legume
leguminous
leisure, Old Fr. , compare modern Fr. 
lemon
lemonade
lenity
lenient
lentil
Leonard
leopard
Leopold
leotard
leprous
lese-majesty
lesion
lessee
lesson
lessor
letter
lettuce
Levant
levee
level
lever
levy
Lewis
lexicographer
liable
liaise
liaison
lias
libel, Old Fr. 
liberal
liberalism
liberality
liberation
libertine
liberty, Old Fr . 
library
libre
license
licorice
liege
lien
lieu
lieutenant
ligature
lignite
lilac
limbic
limit
limousine
limpid
line
lineage
lineal
lineament
lingerie
linnet
lintel
lion
Lionel
lipase
lipid
liquefaction
liquefy
liqueur
liquid
liquor, Old Fr. 
liquorice
list
litany
liter
literal
literary
literature, Old Fr. 
litigant
litigious, Old Fr. 
litotes
litre
litter
litterateur
liturgy
livery
livid
lizard
loach, Old Fr. 
local
locale
localisation
localise
locality
locket
locomotive
locust
lodge
lodgement
logic
logician
logistics
loin
Lombard
longitude
lorgnette
loris
lotion
louche
Louis
Louisiana, Fr. , named for Louis XIV of France
Louisville, named for Louis XVI of France
lounge
loupe
louver
loyal
loyalty
lozenge, Old Fr. , compare modern Fr. 
Lucy
ludic
luff
luge
lumen
luminaire
luminary, Middle Fr. 
lunar
lunatic
lune
lunette
lunge
lupin, Old Fr. 
lure
lush
lustre or luster
lute
luthier
luxe
luxurious
luxury
lymph
lyre
lyric

M

macabre
macaque
macaroon
mace
macédoine
macer
mache
machine
mackerel
mackle
macle
macramé
macrocosm, Old Fr. 
macule
madam (Old Fr. )
madame
madeleine
mademoiselle
maderization
madrilene
magazine
Magdalenian
magic
magician
magistral
magnanimity
magnificence
magnificent
magnify
magnolia
maigre
mail, [post, letters]  Old Fr. , [metal ring armour] Old Fr. 
maillot
maim
Maine (name of the former French province of Maine)
maintain (Old Fr. )
maintenance
maisonette, Fr. 
maître d'hôtel
majesty (Fr. )
major (n.)
majority (Fr. )
majuscule
malachite
maladroit
malady
malaise
malapert
malapropos
malcontent
mal de mer
mal du siècle
male, Old Fr. , compare Mod. Fr. 
malediction
malevolence
malevolent
malfeasance
malic
malice
malicious
malign
malignity
malinger (Fr. )
malison
mallard
mallet
malversation
mammary
manacle
manage
mandolin
maneuver or manoeuvre, Fr. 
manganese
mange
manger
mangetout
mangle
mangonel
maniac
manicure
manipulation
mannequin
manner
manometer
manor
manque
mansard
mansion
mantle, Old Fr. , compare mod. Fr. 
mantua, Fr. 
manual (n.)
manufacture
manure
map
maquette
maquis
maraud
marble
march
March
mardi gras
Margaret
margarine
marinade
marinate
marine, Middle Fr. 
mariner
marionette, Fr. 
marital
maritime
marjoram
market
marl
marmalade, Middle Fr. , from Port. 
marmoset
marmot
maroon
marque
marquee
marquess
marquetry
marquis
marriage, Old Fr. 
marry, Old Fr. 
marshal, Old Fr. , compare modern Fr. 
martel de fer
marten, Old Fr. , compare modern Fr. 
martin
martinet
martingale
marvel, Old Fr. 
marvelous, Old Fr. , compare mod. Fr. 
Marxist, Fr. 
mascle
mascot
masculine
masculinity
mask, Middle Fr. 
mason, Old Fr. , compare mod. Fr. 
masonry, Fr. 
masque
masquerade, Fr. , from Italian 
mass, Old Fr. 
massacre, Middle Fr. 
massage
masseur
masseuse
massicot
massif
massive
master, Old Fr. 
mastery, Old Fr. 
mastic
mastiff
mastitis
mastodon
match [stick for striking fire], Old Fr. , compare mod. Fr. 
matelot
matelote
materialism
materiel
maternal
maternity
mathematician
mathematics
Matilda
matinal
matinee
matins
matricide
matrimonial
matrimony
matrix, Old Fr. 
matron
matte
matter, Anglo-Fr. , compare mod. Fr. 
Matthew, Old Fr. , ultimately from Hebrew 
mattress, Old Fr. , compare modern Fr. 
maturation
Maud, Old Fr. , from Frankish
maudlin
maul
mauve
mavis
maxim
May, Old Fr. 
mayday, Fr. , shortening of  
mayhem, Anglo-Fr. , from Old Fr. 
mayonnaise
mayor, Old Fr. 
mayoralty
meagre
mean [middle, intermediate], Old Fr. , compare mod. Fr. 
measurable
measure
mechanic
medal, Middle Fr. 
medallion
meddle, Old North. Fr.  (Old Fr. , compare mod. Fr. )
median
mediant
medical
medicament
medication
medicine
mediocre, Fr. 
mediocrity
meditation
meditative
medlar
medley, Old Fr. 
megalomania
melancholy
melange
melee or mêlée
melilot
melodic
melodious
melodrama, Fr. 
melody
melon
member
memoir
memorable
memory, Anglo-Fr. , compare mod. Fr. 
menace
menage
ménage à trois
menagerie
mend, Old Fr. 
mendacious, Middle Fr. 
mendicity
menhir, Fr. , from Breton 
menial
menopause
menstruous
mental
mentality
mention
menu
mercantile
mercer
merchandise
merchant
mercy, Old Fr.  or 
mere (adj.), Old Fr. 
merengue
meridian
meridional
meringue
merit
merle
merlin, Anglo-Fr. , from Old Fr. 
Merlin, Old Fr. , from Breton
merlon
mesalliance
mesclun
mesmerism
mesne
mess, Old Fr. 
message
messenger
messuage
metabolism
metal
metallurgy, Fr. 
metamorphose
metaphor
meteor
meteorology
meter or metre
method
méthode champenoise
methylene
meticulous
metier
metric
metro, Fr. 
mew (n.) [cage],  Old Fr. 
mezzanine, Fr. , from Italian 
microbe
microcephalic
microcosm
microgramme
micron
Midi
migraine
migrant
migration
milieu
milfoil
militant
militarisation
militarism
military
Mille Lacs (USA), means 'thousand lakes'
mille-feuille
millet
milliard
milligram
millilitre
millimetre
million
millionaire, Fr. 
mime
minaret, Fr. , from Turkish , from Arabic 
minatory
mince, Old Fr. 
mine (n.), Old Fr. 
miner
miniature
minion
minister, Old Fr. 
ministerial
minority
minstrel
mint
minuet
minuscule
minute
mirabelle
miracle
miraculous
mirage
mirepoix
mirliton
mirror, Old Fr. , compare mod. Fr. 
misadventure, Old Fr. 
miscellany
mischance
mischief
mischievous
miscreant, Old Fr. , compare mod. Fr. 
mise en scène
miserable, Old Fr. 
misery, Old Fr. , compare mod. Fr. 
misfeasance
misnomer
misprision
misprize
missal
missile
mistral
mistress
mitigation
mitre
mitten, Old Fr. 
mix, Anglo-Fr. , compare mod. Fr. 
mixture
mizzen, Middle Fr. 
moat
mobile
mobilisation
mobilise or mobilize
mobility
mock
mockery
modal
modality
mode
model
moderation
modern
modernisation
modest
modesty
modifiable
modification
modify
modist
modulation
module
mohair, Middle Fr. , from Arabic 
moiety
moil
moire
moist, Old Fr. , compare mod. Fr. 
moisture
mold
mole
molecule
molest
molestation
mollification
mollify
mollusc
moment, Old Fr. 
monarchy, Old Fr. 
monastery
monastic
monetary
money, Old Fr. , compare mod. Fr. 
monition
monobloc
monocle
monogamy, Fr. 
monogram
monolith
monolithic
monologue, Fr. 
monopole
monotony
monsieur
monster, Old Fr. 
monstrous
montage
mooch
Moor
moraine
moral
morale
moralise
morality
mordant
morel
morganatic
morgue
moribund
morpheme
morphine
morsel
mort
mortal
mortality
mortar
mortgage
mortise
mortification
mortify
mortise
mortmain
mortuary
mosaic, Old Fr. , compare mod. Fr. 
mosque, Middle Fr. 
mot juste
motet
motif
motion
motivation
motive
motley
moue
mount, Old Fr. 
mountain, Old Fr. , compare mod. Fr. 
mountainous, Fr. 
mousse
moustache or mustache, compare 
mouton enragé
movable
move, Old Fr. , compare mod. Fr. 
movement
mucilage
muck
muffle, Old Fr. 
mulct
mule [footwear]
mullein
mullet
mullion
multiple
multiplication
multiply
multitude
mummification
mummify
mummy
mundane
municipal
municipality
munificence
munition
mural
murmur
murrain
muscat
muscatel
muscle
musculature
muse
mushroom
music
musical
musicality
musician
musk
musket, Middle Fr. 
musketeer, Middle Fr. 
muslin
mustard, Old Fr. , compare modern Fr. 
muster, Old Fr. , compare modern Fr. 
mute
mutineer
mutiny
mutism
mutton
mutual
mutualism
muzzle
myriad
myrtle
mysterious
mystery, Old Fr. , compare modern Fr. 
mystic
mystification
mystify
mystique
mythology

N

nacarat
nacelle
nacre
naiant
naïve
naivete
naivety
nanometre
nanosecond
nanotechnology
narcolepsy
narcotic
nard
narghile
narration
narrative
nasal
natality
nation, Old Fr. , from Latin , compare mod. Fr. 
national
nationalisation
nationalise
nationalism
nationalist
native
nativity
natron
natural, Old Fr. 
naturalisation
naturalise
naturalism
naturalist
nature, Old Fr. 
naturism
nautical, Middle Fr. 
naval, Old Fr. 
navarin
navigable
navigation
navy, Old Fr. 
neat, Anglo-Fr. , from Old Fr. , compare mod. Fr. 
nebulous
nebuly
nécessaire
necessary
necessity
necromancy, Old Fr. , spelling changed in the 16 c. to conform with Greek etymology , compare mod. Fr. 
negation
negative
negatory
negligee
negligence
negligent
negligible
negotiation
negritude
neologism
nephew
nepotism
nervure
neutral
neutralisation
neutralise
neutrality
neve
newel
Nez Perce
nice (Old Fr. )
nicety
niche
nicotine
niece
nitrate
nitre
nitrogen
nobility
noble
noblesse oblige
nocturnal
nocturne
Noel
noise  (Old Fr. )
nomad
nom de guerre
nom de plume
nominalism
nominative
nonage
nonchalance
nonchalant
nonpareil
noose
Nordic
norm
Norman
Normandy
normative
notable
notary
note
notice
notification
notify
notoriety
nougat
noun
nourish
nourishment
nouveau riche
nouveau roman
nouveau
nouvelle cuisine
nouvelle vague
novel
novelty
November
novice (Old Fr. )
novitiate
nuance
nubile
nudism
nuisance
null
nullity (Fr. )
number (Old Fr. )
numeral
numeric
numismatic
nurse
nursery
nurture
nutmeg
nutrition (Fr. )
nutritive
nymph (Old Fr. )

O

obedient, Old Fr. 
obeisance, Old Fr. , compare Mod. Fr. 
obelisk, Middle Fr. 
obesity
obey
objection
objet d'art
oblation
obligation
oblige, Old Fr. , compare Mod. Fr. 
oblique
obliquity
obscene
obscure
obscurity
observance
observant
observatory
observe
obstacle
obtain
obtuse
occasion
occident
occidental
occipital
occupation, Old Fr. , compare Mod. Fr. 
occupy
occur
occurrence
ocean, Old Fr. , compare Mod. Fr. 
Oceania, Fr. 
ocelot, Fr. , from Nahuatl 
ochre
octogenarian
oculist
odalisque
ode
odious, Anglo-Fr. , from Old Fr. , compare Mod. Fr. 
odometer, Fr. 
odour or odor, Anglo-Fr. , from Old Fr. , compare Mod. Fr. 
oeillade
oeuvre
offend
offense, Old Fr. 
offensive
offer
office
officer, Old Fr. 
official
officinal
ogive, Fr. 
ogre
oil, Old Fr. , compare Mod. Fr. 
ointment, Old Fr. 
oleaginous
oligarchy
olive
Oliver
omelette or omelet, Fr. 
omission
omnibus
omnipotent
onerous
onion
onyx
ooh la la
opacity
opal
opaque
operation
opine
opinion, Old Fr. 
opportune
opportunism, Fr. 
opportunity
oppose, Old Fr. 
opposite
opposition, Old Fr. , compare Mod. Fr. 
oppress, Old Fr. 
oppression
opprobrious
opt
optative, Fr. 
optic
optician
optimism, Fr. 
optimist
option
opulence
oracle, Old Fr. 
oracular
orange, Old Fr. , compare Mod. Fr. 
orator
orb
orchestration
ordain, Old Fr. , compare Mod. Fr. 
order, Old Fr. 
ordinance
ordinary
ordination
ordure
organ
organdy
organic
organisation
organise
organism
orgasm
orgy
orient
Oriental
orientalism
orientate
orientation
orifice
oriflamme
origin
original
originality
orimulsion
oriole, Fr. , from Old Provençal 
orison
ormolu
ornament
ornithopter
orogeny
orpine
orthogonal
orthography, Old Fr. , compare Mod. Fr. 
orthopedic
oscillation
osier
osprey
ostensible
ostentation
ostrich
Ottoman
oubliette
ounce
oust
ouster
outrage
outrageous
outré
overt
overture
ovule
oxidant
oxidation
oxide
oxygen
oyer and terminer
oyez
oyster

P

pace, Old Fr. 
pachyderm
pacific
pacification
pacifism
pacifist
pacify
packet
pact
page
pagination
pail
paillard
pain
paint
painter
pair
palace, Old Fr. 
paladin
palate
palatial
palatine
palaver
pale (adj.)
Paleocene
paleontology
palestra
palette
palfrey
palinode
palisade
pallet
palliative
pallor
palm, Old Fr. 
palmer
palp
palpable
palpitant
palpitation
palsy
panache
panda
pane
panegyric
panel
panic
panne
pannier
pansy, Fr. 
pant, Old Fr. 
pantaloons, Fr. 
panther, Old Fr. 
pantry
papa
papal
paper
papier-mâché
papillon
papist
parable
parachute
paraclete
parade
paradise
parados
paragon
paragraph
parallax
parallel
parallelogram
paralyse
paramount, Anglo-Fr. , from Old Fr. 
paramour
parapet
paraphrase
parasite
parasitism
parasol, Fr. , from Italian 
parboil
parcel
parchment
pardon
pare
parent
parentage
parental
parenthesis
par excellence
parfait
parish
parity
park
parlance
parley
parliament
parlour
parochial
parole
paroxysm
parquet
parricide
parrot
parry
parse
parsley
parsnip
parson
part (Old Fr. )
parterre
partial (Old Fr.
partiality
participant
participation
participle
particular
particularism
particularity
partisan
partition
partner
partridge
party
parvenu
pas
pass (Old Fr. )
passable
passage
passant
passé
passenger
passion
passive
passport
paste
pastel
pastern
pasteurisation
pasteurise
pastiche
pastille
pastis
pastor
pastoral
pastry
pasturage
pasture
pasty
patch
patchouli
pâté
patent
paternal
paternity
pathetic
pathology
patience (Old Fr. )
patient
patina
patisserie
patois
patriarch
patrician
patrimony
patriot
patriotic
patriotism
patrol
patron
patronage
patten
pattern
paucity
paunch
pause (Old Fr. )
pave
pavement
pavilion
paw
pawn (Old Fr.)
pay
payment
paynim
peace (Old Fr. )
peaceable
peach
pearl
peasant
peasantry
pecan
pectin
pedagogue
pedagogy
pedal
pedant
pedantry
pederast
pedestal
pedicure
pedigree
pedometer
peel
peer
peignoir
pejorative
pelage
pelf
pelisse
pellet
pell-mell (Fr. )
peloton
pelt (Old Fr. )
pen (Old Fr. )
penal
penalty
penance
penchant
pencil
pendant
pendentive
penitence
penitent
pennant
pennon
pension
pensioner
pensive
pentagon
pentameter
penthouse, Anglo-Fr. , from Old Fr. 
penury
people (Old Fr. )
peradventure, Old Fr. , refashioned as though from Latin
percale
perceive
perch (Old Fr. )
perchance, Old Fr. 
percussion
perdition
père
peregrination
peregrine
peremptory
perfect
perfection
perfidy
perforce, Old Fr. 
perform
perfume, from Middle French, 
perfusion
perianth
peridot
peril
perilous
period
periodic
periodicity
periphery
perish
peristyle
perjure
perjury
permanent
permissible
permission
permissive
permit
permutation
pernicious
perpendicular
perpetual
perpetuity
perron
perry
perse
persecute
persecution
perseverance
persevere
Persian
persist
persistence
person (Old Fr. )
personage
personal
personality
personify
personnel
perspective
perspicacity
perspiration
persuasion
persuasive
pertain
pertinacity
pertinence
pertinent
perturb
perturbation
peruke
perverse
perversity
pervert
pessimism
pessimist
pest
pestilence
pestle
petard
petiole
petit
petite
petite bourgeoisie
petit four
petition
petrification
petrify
petroglyph
petrol
petty (Old Fr. )
petulance
petulant, compare 
petunia
pew
phaeton
phalange
phalanstery
phantasm
phantasmagoria
phantom, Old Fr. , compare Mod. Fr. 
pharmacy
pheasant
phial
philanthropic (Fr. )
philately (Fr. )
philharmonic
philology
philosophe
philosopher
philosophy (Old Fr. )
philtre (Fr. )
phlebotomy
phlegm
phlegmatic
Phoenician
phoenix, Old Fr. , compare Mod. Fr. 
phoresy
phosphate
photography, Fr. 
phylactery
physic, Old Fr. , compare Mod. Fr. 
physician
physique
pianist
pickaxe
picket
picnic
piece (Old Fr. )
piece de resistance
pied-à-terre
pierce
Pierrot
Piers
piety (Old Fr. )
pigeon
pike
pilaster
pilfer
pilgrim
pillage
pillar
pillory
pilot
pimp
pimpernel
pince-nez
pinch
pineal
pinion
pinnace
pinnacle
pinot
pint
piolet
pioneer
pipette
pippin
piquant
pique
piqué
piquet
pirate
pirogue
pirouette
piss, Old Fr. , compare Mod. Fr. 
piste
pistil
pistol
pistole
piston
pitcher
piteous
pitiable
piton
pittance
pity
pivot
placard
place
placid
plague
plaice
plain (Old Fr. )
plaint
plaintiff
plaintive
plait
plan
planchet
plane
planet
plank
plant
plantain
plantation
plantigrade
plaque
plastron
plat du jour
plate
plateau
platen
platform (Fr. )
platitude
platoon (Fr. )
platter
plea (Old Fr. )
plead
pleasant (Old Fr. )
pleasantry (Old Fr. )
please, Old Fr. , subj. of 
pleasure (Old Fr. , modern French )
pleat
plebiscite (Fr. )
pledge (Old Fr. )
plenitude
plenteous
plenty
pleurisy
pliable
pliant
plié
plinth
plover
plumage
plumb
plumber (Old Fr. )
plume
plummet
plunge
plural (Old Fr. )
plurality
plus ça change
plush
pluvial
ply
poach
pocket
poem (Fr. )
poesy (Old Fr. )
poet
poetic (Fr. )
poignant
point
pointillism
poise
poison
poke (n.)
polarise or polarize
police
policy
polish
politesse
politic
polity
polonaise
poltroon
polytechnic
polytheism
pomade
pome
pomegranate
pommel
pomp
pompom
pompadour
pompier
pompous
ponder
poniard
pontiff
pontoon
pony
pool [game]
poontang
poop
poor, Old Fr. , compare Mod. Fr. 
popinjay
poplar
poplin
populace (Fr. )
porcelain
porch
porcine
porcupine
pork
pornography
porous
porphyry
porpoise
porridge
port (Old Fr. )
portable
portage
portcullis
porte cochère
portent
porter
portière
portion
portmanteau
portrait
portraiture
portray
pose, compare 
poseur
position (Old Fr. )
positive (Old Fr. )
positivism
possess (Old Fr. , modern Fr. )
possessive
possibility
possible (Fr. )
post, compare 
postal
posterity
postern
postilion, Fr. 
postulant
posture
pot
potable
potation
potion
potpourri
pottage
potter
pottery
pouch
pouffe
poult
poulterer
poultry
pounce
poutine, Quebec Fr.
poverty, Old Fr. , compare Mod. Fr. 
powder, Old Fr. , compare Mod. Fr. 
power, Old Fr. , compare Mod. Fr. 
practicable
practical (Old Fr. )
practise
pragmatic
prairie
praise
praline
pray
prayer
preach
preacher
preamble
prebend
precaution
precede
precedence
precedent
precious
precipice
precipitation
precipitous
precis
precise
precision
precocity
predestination
predestine
predilection
predisposition
predominance
predominant
preen
preface
prefect
prefecture
prefer
preferable
preference
prefix
pregnancy
pregnant
prehensile
prehistoric
prehistory
prejudge
prejudice
prelate
preliminary
prelude
premature
premier
premiere (Fr. )
premise
premiss
premolar
premonition
prenatal
preoccupation
preoccupy
preparation
prepare
prepuce
prerogative
presage
prescription
presence
present
presentable
presentation
presentiment
preservation
preservative
preserve
preside
presidence
president
press
pressure
prestidigitation
prestige
presume
presumption
presumptuous
presuppose
presupposition
prêt-à-porter
pretend
pretense
pretentious
preterite
prevail
prevalence
prevalent
prevarication
prevision
prevue
prey
price (Old Fr. )
priest
prim
primacy
primate
primitive
primogeniture
primrose
prince (Old Fr. )
princess
princical
principality (Old Fr. )
principle
print
priority
priory
prise
prison (Old Fr. )
prisoner
pristine
privation
privilege
privity
privy
prix fixe
prize
probability
probable
probation
probity
problem
problematic
procedure
proceed
process
procession
proclaim
proclamation
procreation
procurable
procurator
procure
procurement
procurer
prodigal
prodigality
prodigious
production
profanation
profane
profer
profess
profession
proffer
profile
profit
profitable
profiteroles
profound
profundity
profusion
progenitor
progeny
prognostication
programme
progress
progression
prohibition
projection
proletariat
proliferation
prolific
prolix
prologue
prolong
prolongation
promenade
prominence
prominent
promiscuity
promise
promotion
prompt
promptitude
promulgation
pronation
prone
pronoun (Fr. )
pronounce
pronouncement
pronunciation
proof (Old Fr. )
propagation
propane
proper (Old Fr. )
property
prophecy (Old Fr. )
prophesy
prophet
prophetess
prophetic
propinquity
propitious
proport
proportion (Old Fr. )
propose, from 
proposition (Old Fr. )
propriety
prorogue
prosaic
prose (Old Fr. )
prosecution
proselyte
prospective
prospectus
prosper
prosperity
prosperous
prostate
protection (Old Fr. )
protectionism
protectionist
protector
protege
protegee
protein
protest
Protestant
protestation
protocol (Old Fr. )
prototype
protrusion
protuberance
proud (Old Fr. )
prove
provenance
Provence
provender
proverb
providence
province (Old Fr. )
provincial
provincialism
provision
provisional
provocation
provoke
provost
prow
prowess
proximity
proxy
prude
prudence
prudent
prudery
prune
psaltery
pseudonym
psychiatry
pterodactyl
puberty
pubescent
public
publication
publicist
publicity
publish
puce
puerility
pugnacity
puissance
puissant
pulley
pulse
pulverisation
pumice
pump
pumpkin
punch
puncheon
punish (Old Fr. )
punishment
punitive
puny
pup
pupil
puppet
puppy
purchase
pure (Old Fr. )
puree
purgative
purge
purification
purify (Old Fr. )
purist
purity
purloin
purport
purpose (Old Fr. )
purse
pursuant
pursue
pursuit
purulent
purvey
purveyor
purview
push
pusillanimity
pustule
putative
putrefaction
putrefy
putridity
putty (Modern Fr. )
pyramid
pyrite

Q

quadrangle
quadrangular
quadrille
quadruped
quail
quaint
quality
quantity
quarrel
quarry
quart
quarter
quartet
quartier
quartile
quash
quaternary
quatrain
quatrefoil
quay
queasy
Québécois
Quentin
querulous
quest
question
questionnaire
queue
qui vive
quiche
quiet
quietude
quilt
quince
quinsy
quint
quintain
quintal
quintessence
quintuple
quire
quit
quittance
quiver
quoit
quote
quotidian

R

rabat
rabbit
race
racism
racket
raconteur
racquet
radiant
radioactive
raffle
rage, Old Fr. 
ragout
rail
raillery
raiment
raisin
raison d'être
rally
ramification
ramify
ramp
rampage
rampant
rampart
rancour
random
range
rank
rankle
ransom
rapacity
rape
rapids
rapier
rapine
rappel
rapport
rapporteur
rapprochement
rapture
rare, Old Fr. 
rarefy
rarity
rascal
rasp
rastaquouère
ratafia
ratatouille
ratchet
rate
ratification
ratify
ration
rationalisation
rationalism
rationality
raucous
ravage
rave
raven
ravenous
ravine
ravish
ray
Raymond
rayon
raze
razor
reaction
reactionary
reactive
reaffirm
reaffirmation
real, Old Fr. 
realisable
realisation
realise
reality
realm
ream (n.)
rear
reason, Old Fr. 
reasonable
reassure
rebarbative
rebate
rebec
rebel
rebellion
rebound
rebuff
rebuke
rebut
recalcitrance
recalcitrant
recapitulation
recede
receipt
receive, Old Fr. , compare Modern Fr. 
receptacle
reception
receptor
recharge
recherche
recidivist
recipe
recipient
reciprocity
recitation
recite
reclaim
reclamation
recluse
recognizance
recognize
recoil
recollection
recommence
recommencement
recommend
recommendation
recompense
reconciliation
reconfigure
reconnaissance
reconnoitre, compare 
record
recordation
recorder, Old Fr. 
recount
recoup
recourse
recover
recovery
recreant
recreation
recrimination
recruit
rectangle
rectification
rectify
rectitude
rectory
recuse
redolent
redouble
redoubt
redoubtable
redound
redress
reduce
reduction
refer
reflect
reform
refrain
refresh
refreshment
refuge
refugee
refund
refuse
regain
regale
regard
regenerative
regent
regime
regiment
region
regional
regret
regroup
regular
rehabilitation
rehearse
reign
reimburse
rein
rejection
rejoice
rejoin
rejoinder
relation
relative
relax
relay
release
relic
relief
relieve
religion
religious
relinquish
reliquary
relish
rely
remain, Old Fr. 
remainder
remand
remark
remarkable
remedy
remember
remembrance
remise
remission
remnant
remonstrance
remorse
remoulade
remove
renaissance
render
rendezvous
rendition
renounce
renouncement
renown
rent
rentier
repair
reparable
repartee
repartition
repast
repay
repeal
repeat
repel
repent
repentance
repentant
repercussion
repertoire
replenish
replenishment
replete
replevin
replication
reply
report
repose
repoussé
represent
representative
reprieve
reprimand
reprisal
reprise
reproach
reprove
reptile
republic
repugnance
repulsive
repute
request
require
requisition
rescue
research
resemblance
resemble
resent
resentment
reservation
reserve
reservoir
reside
residence
residue
resign
resignation
resile
resin
resist
resistance
resistant
resonance
resort
resound
resource
respire
respite
respond
response
responsibility
responsible
responsive
ressentiment
rest
restaurant
restaurateur
restitute
restive
restore
restrain
restraint
restrictive
résumé
resurrection
retail
retain
retard
retardant
retentive
reticence
reticule
retinue
retire
retirement
retouch
retrace
retreat
retrench
retrenchment
retrieve
retroactive
return
reunion
revanche
revanchist
reveal
reveille
revel
revelation
revenant
revenge
revenue
reverberant
reverberation
revere
reverence
reverend
reverie
reverse
reverser
reversion
revert
revetment
review
revile
revise
revision
revisit
revive
revivify
revocable
revoke
revolt
revolution
revue
reward
rhapsody
rhetoric
rheumatic
rhubarb
rhyme
ribald
ribaldry
ribbon
rice
Richard
riches
ricochet
ridicule
rifle
rigor or rigour
rigorous
rink
rinse
riot
riposte
risk
risqué
river
rivet
rivulet
roach
roan
roast
rob
robbery
robe
Robert
robin
rock
rocket (plant), Fr. 
rococo
Roger
rogue
roil
roister
Roland
role
roll, Old Fr. 
romaine
Roman
roman à clef
romance
romantic
Rome
rondeau
rondel
rook (chesspiece)
rosé
rosette
rosin
rotisserie
roué
rouge
roulette
round
roundel
roundelay
rouse
rout, Old Fr. 
route
routine
roux
rowel
royal, Old Fr. , compare Mod. Fr. 
royalty
rubbish
rubble
rubric
ruby
ruche
rude
rudiment
rue (plant)
ruffian
ruin
ruinous
rule
rummage
rumor or rumour
rupture
rural
ruse
rush, Old Fr. 
Russell
russet
rut

See also 

 French phrases used by English speakers
 Law French
 Glossary of fencing, (predominantly from French).
 Glossary of ballet (predominantly from French)
 Lists of English loanwords by country or language of origin
 List of English words of Gaulish origin
 List of English words of Latin origin
 List of English Latinates of Germanic origin
 List of English words of Frankish origin
 Latin influence in English
 List of French words of Germanic origin
 List of French words of Gaulish origin
 List of French words of Arabic origin

References

External links
Oxford English Dictionary
Dictionary.com
Online Etymology Dictionary
Centre National de Ressources Textuelles et Lexicales 

French